Varak Bar-e Sofla (also Romanized as Varak Bār-e Soflá; also known as Varak Bār, Varakbār, and Varak Bār-e Pā’īn) is a village in Shahsavan Kandi Rural District, in the Central District of Saveh County, Markazi Province, Iran. At the 2006 census, its population was 8, in 7 families.

References 

Populated places in Saveh County